State Route 177 (SR 177) is a north–south state highway located in the southwest corner of the U.S. state of Ohio. The southern terminus of State Route 177 is at the signalized junction of State Route 4 and State Route 129 in Hamilton, after State Route 177 runs concurrently with State Route 129 for its southernmost . From this point, State Route 177 continues into Indiana as Indiana State Road 227.

Route description
State Route 177 runs northwesterly through Butler and Preble Counties.  No segment of the highway is included within the National Highway System.

History
State Route 177 was first designated in 1934 along its current alignment, replacing what was previously designated as State Route 224. The re-designation came as a result of the debut of U.S. Route 224 in Ohio that year, and the state's practice of not duplicating a state route designation for a U.S. highway designation.  No changes have taken place to the routing of State Route 177 since it was established.

Major intersections

References

177
Transportation in Butler County, Ohio
Transportation in Preble County, Ohio